The 2021 French Open was a major level tennis tournament played on outdoor clay courts. It was held at the Stade Roland Garros in Paris, France, from 30 May to 13 June 2021, comprising singles, doubles and mixed doubles play. The qualifiers took place from 24 May to 28 May. Junior and wheelchair tournaments also took place. Rafael Nadal was the four-time defending champion in men's singles, and Iga Świątek was the defending champion in women's singles.

It was the 125th edition of the French Open and the second Grand Slam event of 2021. The main singles draws included 16 qualifiers for men and 16 for women out of 128 players in each draw, the last Grand Slam to still have 128 women qualifiers instead of 96 in line with the other three majors.

Novak Djokovic won the men's singles title over Stefanos Tsitsipas in the final, marking his 19th Grand Slam singles title and making him the first male player to win the double career Grand Slam in the Open Era. Barbora Krejčíková won the women's singles title over Anastasia Pavlyuchenkova in the final, claiming her maiden Grand Slam singles title. This was the first time in French Open history that both singles victors were from Slavic-speaking nations, namely Serbia and the Czech Republic.

This was the first edition of the event to have formal night sessions in the schedule, joining a practice already established at the Australian Open and US Open, with one match having a 21:00 local time start time each day.

This was the final Grand Slam to use the advantage set in the final set at singles matches, where it was replaced by final set tiebreaker in future tournaments.

The mixed doubles event returned after a one-year absence, though the draw featured only 16 teams instead of the regular 32.

Impact of the COVID-19 pandemic 
The beginning of the tournament returned to its traditional late-May schedule after the previous edition being delayed to September 2020 due to the COVID-19 pandemic. On 8 April, the originally-announced dates were postponed by one week by the French Tennis Federation due to a third national lockdown and curfew in France enacted the week prior, with the first day of qualifiers pushed back to 24 May, and first day of the tournament proper pushed back to 30 May. The postponement was made in the hope that restrictions would be eased in time for the tournament, including potentially allowing spectators.

At the start of the tournament, the main courts were capped at 1,000 spectators, and spectators were prohibited after 21:00 nightly due to the nationwide curfew. This caused night session matches to be held behind closed doors. Beginning 9 June, the curfew was moved to 23:00, and centre court was permitted to expand to 5,000 spectators. During the 11 June semi-final match between Novak Djokovic and Rafael Nadal, Prime Minister Jean Castex personally phoned the organizers after a 93-minute third-set tiebreak set to issue an exemption, allowing the match to be played to its conclusion with spectators.

Singles players 
Men's singles

Women's singles

Events

Men's singles

  Novak Djokovic def.  Stefanos Tsitsipas 6–7(6–8), 2–6, 6–3, 6–2, 6–4

Women's singles

  Barbora Krejčíková def.  Anastasia Pavlyuchenkova 6–1, 2–6, 6–4

Men's doubles

  Pierre-Hugues Herbert /  Nicolas Mahut def.  Alexander Bublik /  Andrey Golubev 4–6, 7–6(7–1), 6–4

Women's doubles

  Barbora Krejčíková /  Kateřina Siniaková def.  Bethanie Mattek-Sands /  Iga Świątek 6–4, 6–2

Mixed doubles

  Desirae Krawczyk /  Joe Salisbury def.  Elena Vesnina /  Aslan Karatsev, 2–6, 6–4, [10–5]

Wheelchair men's singles

  Alfie Hewett def.  Shingo Kunieda, 6–3, 6–4

Wheelchair women's singles

  Diede de Groot def.  Yui Kamiji, 6–4, 6–3

Wheelchair quad singles

  Dylan Alcott def.  Sam Schröder, 6–4, 6–2

Wheelchair men's doubles

  Alfie Hewett /  Gordon Reid def.  Stéphane Houdet /  Nicolas Peifer, 6–3, 6–0

Wheelchair women's doubles

  Diede de Groot /  Aniek van Koot def.  Yui Kamiji /  Jordanne Whiley, 6–3, 6–4

Wheelchair quad doubles 

  Andy Lapthorne /  David Wagner def.  Dylan Alcott /  Sam Schröder, 7–6(7–1), 4–6, [10–7]

Boys' singles

  Luca Van Assche def.  Arthur Fils, 6–4, 6–2

Girls' singles

  Linda Nosková def.  Erika Andreeva, 7–6(7–3), 6–3

Boys' doubles

  Arthur Fils /  Giovanni Mpetshi Perricard def.  Martin Katz /  German Samofalov, 7–5, 6–2

Girls' doubles

  Alex Eala /  Oksana Selekhmeteva def.  Maria Bondarenko /  Amarissa Kiara Tóth, 6–0, 7–5

Point distribution and prize money

Point distribution

As a Grand Slam tournament, the points for the French Open are the highest of all ATP and WTA tournaments. These points determine the world ATP and WTA rankings for men's and women's competition, respectively. In both singles and doubles, women received slightly higher point totals compared to their male counterparts at each round of the tournament, except for the first and last. Points and rankings for the wheelchair events fall under the jurisdiction of the ITF Wheelchair Tennis Tour, which also places Grand Slams as the highest classification.

The ATP and WTA rankings were both altered in 2020 due to the COVID-19 pandemic. Both rankings were frozen on 16 March 2020 upon the suspension of both tours, and as a result the traditional 52-week ranking system was extended to cover the period from March 2019 to March 2021 with a player's best 18 results in that time period factoring into their point totals.

For the ATP, In March 2021, the ATP extended the "best of" logic to their rankings through to the week of 9 August 2021.
Players who have played the same Tour-level event more than once, adopt a "best of" and can count their highest points total from the same tournament,
Results from the rescheduled 2020 event will also be included for an additional 52 weeks at 50%.
 
For the WTA, if the event was rescheduled outside of four weeks of the normal tournament date, such as Roland Garros, the following applies:
2019 points will drop off at 2021 edition,
2020 points will stay on for 52 weeks if the points earned are better than the 2021 results or the player does not compete at the event in 2021,
In the event that 2020 points are used, they will drop off after 52 weeks, being replaced by the 2021 points.

Below is a series of tables for each of the competitions showing the ranking points on offer for each event:

Senior points

Wheelchair points

Junior points

Prize money
About a month before the tournament began, the prize money pool was announced to be €34,367,215, a reduction of 10.53% compared to the prize pool for 2020 edition.

*per team

References

External links

 Roland Garros